1977 West Bank Premier League was the first season of the West Bank Premier League and the 4th completion of the Palestinian Top Tier. The Champion was Silwan.

League table

References

West Bank Premier League seasons
West Bank
West Bank
League